Sandra Love (October 12, 1945 – February 13, 2018) was an American Democratic Party politician, who served in the New Jersey General Assembly from January 8, 2008 to January 12, 2010, where she represented the 4th Legislative District.

Love served in the Assembly on the Commerce and Economic Development Committee and the Health and Senior Services Committee.

She was the Mayor of Gloucester Township, New Jersey from 1994 to 2006.

Love attended Eastern Michigan University, majoring in education, and Rowan University.

Love decided not to seek re-election in 2009, citing health issues.

Love died on February 13, 2018.

District 4 
Each of the forty districts in the New Jersey Legislature has one representative in the New Jersey Senate and two members in the New Jersey General Assembly. The other representatives from the 4th Legislative District for the 2006-2008 legislative session were:
Assemblyman Paul D. Moriarty, and
Senator Fred H. Madden

References

External links
, New Jersey Legislature
New Jersey Legislature financial disclosure forms
2008 2007
Assembly Majority Web site
 Fourth Legislative District Web site

1945 births
2018 deaths
Eastern Michigan University alumni
Mayors of places in New Jersey
Democratic Party members of the New Jersey General Assembly
People from Gloucester Township, New Jersey
Politicians from Camden County, New Jersey
Rowan University alumni
Women state legislators in New Jersey
Women mayors of places in New Jersey
21st-century American politicians
21st-century American women politicians
20th-century American politicians
20th-century American women politicians